Ajit Kumar Dutta, known as Ajit Dutta, (23 September 1907 – 30 December 1979) was a prominent Bengali poet, writer, essayist and professor.

Early life
Ajit Dutta passed the entrance examination from Kishorilal Jubilee School in Dhaka in 1924 and was admitted to the  Jagannath College ( present day Jagannath University ). After passing the Higher Secondary, he moved to Calcutta in 1926 and was admitted to Vidyasagar College with Honors in English. But within a few days, after the death of his elder brother, he returned to Dhaka and was admitted in the Bangla and Sanskrit department of Dhaka University. Ajit Dutt placed first in first class in BA in 1926 and MA in 1930 from Dhaka University.

Career
Ajit Dutt started his career by joining Dhaka University on a temporary basis. Shortly afterwards, he started teaching at Ripon School in Calcutta. He left school in 1934 and joined Ripon College . He also taught in Presidency College and joined the Indian Tea Market Expansion Board as an Assistant Publicity Officer, where he served for 10 years. He was publicity officer of Calcutta National Bank. After serving here for 10 years, he joined the teaching of Bangla Department of Jadavpur University on 21 August 1956. He retired from the university on 12 February 1971 as the head of the department.

Literature contribution
Ajit Dutt's first book of poetry, Kusumer Mash, was published in 1930. He was a colleague of Buddhadeb Bose. He co-edited a magazine called Pragati with Buddhadev Bose. Later he joined Kallol literary group. Ajit Dutt used to write regularly in Kallol, a popular Bengali literary magazine in the 1930s. In 1946, the year after the publication of his poem Nosto Chand,  his essay "Mon Paboner Nou" continuously published in Desh Patrika under the pen-name of Raibat Chhand. Ajit Dutt wrote 50 essays on contemporary Bengali poetry, rhyming thought, thoughts on Rabindra, evaluation of works of various poets and writers, thoughts on art literature and children's literature. Ajit Dutt also played a significant role in the founding of the popular literary magazine Kavita, edited by Buddhadev Bose. He was one of the leading authors of this magazine. He started a publishing house called 'Diganta'.

Literary works

Books published by Ajit Dutta

Poetry books
 Kusumer Mash (1930) 
 Patal Kanya (1938)
 Nasto Chand (1945)
 Purnanaba (1946)
 Charar boi (1950)
 Chayar Alpona (1951)
 Jalna (1959)
 Kabita-Sangraho (1959)
 Sada Mekh Kalo Pahar (1971)
Essays
 "Janantika" (1949)
 "Mon Paboner Noi" (1950)
 "Saras Prabandha" (1968)
 "Bangla Sahitye Hasros" (1960)
 "KathaBharati" (translate) 
 "Durga Pujar Golpo" (translate)

Death
He died on December 30, 1989, at his own residence in Kolkata.

References

1907 births
1979 deaths
Writers from Kolkata
Poets from West Bengal
Bengali-language writers
Bengali poets
20th-century Indian writers
20th-century Indian male writers
Indian male writers
Academic staff of Jadavpur University
Vidyasagar College alumni
Jagannath University alumni
Alumni
Bengali Hindus
20th-century Bengalis
20th-century Bengali poets
Indian essayists
Indian male essayists
20th-century Indian essayists
20th-century essayists
20th-century Indian poets
Indian male poets